Farid Hazem (born 19 June 1986) is a French former professional footballer who played as a defender.

He played on the professional level in Ligue 2 for En Avant de Guingamp, then in Championnat National from 2006 to 2008. In 2012, he moved to Réunion.

References

1986 births
Living people
Association football defenders
French footballers
Ligue 2 players
En Avant Guingamp players
FC Martigues players
Red Star F.C. players
Pau FC players
SO Châtellerault players